Rev. Alexander James Grieve (18 March 1874 – 23 September 1952), was a British theologian, writer and Liberal Party politician.

Background
Grieve was born the eldest son of John Grieve. He was educated at University College, Aberystwyth, Mansfield College, Oxford and the University of Berlin. He obtained a First Class Honors in Theology at Oxford in 1897 and London in 1912. In 1897 he married Evelyne Mary Thomas. They had four sons and two daughters.

Professional career
Grieve was Principal of Lancashire Independent College from 1922–43 and Principal Emeritus from 1943.

Political career
Grieve was Liberal candidate for the Glasgow Kelvingrove division at the 1923 General Election. He did not stand for parliament again.

Electoral record

References

External links

1874 births
1952 deaths
Liberal Party (UK) parliamentary candidates
Alumni of Mansfield College, Oxford
Alumni of Aberystwyth University
Humboldt University of Berlin alumni